Mymensingh City Corporation is the municipal government of the city of Mymensingh, Bangladesh.

Mymensingh Municipality was upgraded to a city corporation, the country's 12th, on 2 April 2018 at a meeting of the National Implementation Committee on Administrative Reforms (NICAR), after satisfying all eight criteria for forming a city corporation. At the time, Cabinet Division Secretary (Coordination and Reforms) NM Ziaul Alam declared that the new city corporation would consist of Mymensingh Municipality, two whole union parishads, and parts of six others, out of the thirteen union parishads of Mymensingh Sadar Upazila.

History
In September 2011, the Mymensingh Zila Nagorik Andolon campaigned to turn Mymensingh into the divisional capital and a city corporation. Prime Minister Sheikh Hasina announced plans to turn Mymensingh into a city corporation in January 2013. Mymensingh city was made the capital of the newly formed Mymensingh division, which was the 8th division of Bangladesh. On 20 November 2017 the National Implementation Committee for Administrative Reorganisation decided to make Mymensingh into a city corporation. The incumbent mayor is the Municipality Mayor Ekramul Haque Titu. Mymensingh has not held an election since being turned into a city corporation.

List of Mayors

References

 
Mymensingh
Mymensingh